Wolfgang Stammler (2 August 1937 – 6 February 2022) was a German politician.

A member of the Christian Democratic Union of Germany, he served in the Landtag of Hesse from 1995 to 1997. He died in Frankfurt on 6 February 2022, at the age of 84.

References

1937 births
2022 deaths
20th-century German politicians
Christian Democratic Union of Germany politicians
Members of the Landtag of Hesse
Goethe University Frankfurt alumni
Politicians from Frankfurt